Gerda Weissensteiner OMRI (born 3 January 1969) is an Italian luger and bobsleigh pilot who competed from the late 1980s to 2006. Competing in six Winter Olympics, she won the gold medal in the women's singles luge event at the 1994 Winter Olympics in Lillehammer, and together with Jennifer Isacco she won the bronze in Turin in the two-woman bobsleigh at the 2006 Winter Olympics. She was the first Italian sportsperson to win Olympic medals in two disciplines.

Luge career
Weissensteiner was introduced to luge by her uncle at the age of seven, initially sledding on natural luge tracks. She won a World Junior Luge Championship title in 1988.

Weissensteiner won eleven medals at the FIL World Luge Championships, including two gold (Women's singles: 1993, Mixed team: 1989), three silvers (Women's singles: 1989, Mixed team: 1990, 1995), and six bronzes (Women's singles: 1995, 1996; Mixed team: 1991, 1993, 1996, 1997).

She was also won seven medals at the FIL European Luge Championships with two golds (Mixed team and Women's singles: both in 1994), two silvers (Women's singles: 1990; Mixed team: 1998), and three bronzes (Mixed team: 1988, 1990, 1996).

Weissensteiner won the overall Luge World Cup title in women's singles twice (1992-3, 1997-8). She took a total of 13 wins, eight second places and eight third places in World Cup races. She was also the flagbearer at the opening ceremonies of the 1998 Winter Olympics in Nagano. Her Olympic triumph was dampened by the death of her brother in a car accident a few days later: during his funeral, a burglar broke into Weissensteiner's home and stole her gold medal. Following the Games she retired from luge, becoming a youth luge coach.

Bobsleigh career
Weissensteiner returned to sledding as a bobsleigh pilot in 2001. She finished seventh in the 2-woman bobsleigh (with the former biker Antonella Bellutti, a gold medalist in track cycling) at the 2002 Winter Olympics. After the 2002 Games she teamed up with sprinter Jennifer Isacco, who she competed with until her retirement from the sport. Their best finish in the Bobsleigh World Cup was third twice in the two-woman event. (2002-3, 2003-4 (tied with Germany's Susi Erdmann)). She finished sixth in the 2-woman bobsleigh event at the 2005 FIBT World Championships in Calgary, Alberta, Canada. The following year, Weissensteiner and Isacco finished second in the European Championships, and Weissensteiner joined Erdmann as being one of only two sledders to win a medal in both bobsleigh and luge at the Winter Olympics.

She retired from all competition after the 2006 Winter Olympics in Turin. That year she was appointed as a Knight of the Order of Merit of the Italian Republic. In addition she has a rhododendron named after her: this was part of a collaboration between the Accademia dei Georgofili and the Italian National Olympic Committee to name an azalea after each medal winner at the 2006 Winter Olympics and the 2006 Winter Paralympics. Subsequently, she returned to youth coaching in luge as well as working as a press officer for the Italian Luge Federation.

See also
 List of athletes with the most appearances at Olympic Games
 List of athletes with Olympic medals in different disciplines
 Italian sportswomen multiple medalists at Olympics and World Championships

References
 1988 luge women's singles results
 1992 luge women's singles results
 1998 luge women's singles results
 2002 bobsleigh two-woman results
 Bobsleigh two-woman Olympic medalists since 2002

External links
 

1969 births
Living people
Sportspeople from Bolzano
Italian female bobsledders
Italian female lugers
Bobsledders at the 2002 Winter Olympics
Bobsledders at the 2006 Winter Olympics
Lugers at the 1988 Winter Olympics
Lugers at the 1992 Winter Olympics
Lugers at the 1994 Winter Olympics
Lugers at the 1998 Winter Olympics
Olympic bobsledders of Italy
Olympic bronze medalists for Italy
Olympic gold medalists for Italy
Olympic lugers of Italy
Olympic medalists in bobsleigh
Olympic medalists in luge
Medalists at the 2006 Winter Olympics
Medalists at the 1994 Winter Olympics
Knights of the Order of Merit of the Italian Republic
Italian sports coaches
Germanophone Italian people